José Rolando Andrade Gonçalves, (11 June 1944 - 4 February 2022), known as José Rolando, was a Portuguese footballer who played as a centre back.

During his career, Rolando played for five different teams in which he spent the majority of his career with Porto.

Rolando made his debut for the Portugal national football team on 11 December 1968 in a 4–2 away loss against Greece in a 1970 FIFA World Cup qualifying match. He went on to gain a further seven more caps, of which his last national team appearance came on 29 March 1972 against Cyprus in a 4–0 home victory.

Death
Rolando died on 4 February 2022 at the age of 77 of undisclosed causes.

References

External links 
 
 

1944 births
2022 deaths
Footballers from Porto
Portuguese footballers
Association football midfielders
Portugal international footballers
Primeira Liga players
FC Porto players
Segunda Divisão players
F.C. Paços de Ferreira players
F.C. Penafiel players
S.C. Freamunde players
Portugal B international footballers